Washington Park was a baseball park in Los Angeles, California, United States. It was primarily used for baseball and was the home of the Los Angeles Angels in the Pacific Coast League (PCL) from its opening on March 28, 1911, until they moved to Wrigley Field late in the 1925 season. The final game at Washington Park was held on September 27, 1925.

Through the 1910 season, the Angels had played at the ballfield contained within Chutes Park, a city amusement park bounded by Washington (north), Main (east), 21st (south) and Grand (west).

In the 1910-1911 off-season, the old ballpark and some of the rides were demolished, and a new ballpark was built within the same large block. Sanborn maps show that the new infield and covered stands were positioned south and east of their predecessor, overlaying the centerfield area of the old park and much of the former waterslide area. Hill Street was eventually cut through the western portion of the large block. The new ballpark bordered Hill Street on its first base side, and was set back from Washington (third base), Main (left field) and 21st (right field). Some local newspapers dubbed it "Washington-Street Park", but "Washington Park" was the prevailing reference.

The remaining amusement park structures were sold in late December 1912 and soon demolished. After having played in somewhat cramped quarters for two seasons, Washington Park's seating areas and the outfield itself were expanded for the 1913 season. The now-vacant areas along Main and Washington were eventually allocated for parking. Contemporary city directories give the ballpark's address as 218 West Washington.

A number of aerial photos of Washington Park exist. Some of them show an H-shaped building on the northwest corner of Main and Washington. That building provides a good landmark to orient the photos with the current street maps.

In 1913 and 1914, the Venice Tigers of the PCL also played home games at Washington Park, except for Sunday morning and special holiday games.

A football game between USC and California on November 25, 1915 drew 8,000 spectators, the largest crowd to have seen a football game in Southern California at that time.

The sources say that William Wrigley, Jr., owner of the Angels was rebuffed in his request to build an underground parking garage beneath the ballpark. He then decided to build a new ballpark, which was named Wrigley Field and opened late in the 1925 season, at 42nd Street and Avalon Boulevard.

Washington Park was demolished soon after the final game in 1925. As of February 2022, the site is occupied by commercial buildings, parking lots, and a McDonald's. Los Angeles Trade–Technical College (LATTC) is a block to the west, as is the Grand/LATTC station of the Los Angeles Metro Rail system. The International Mart (formerly the Mode O'Day building), a 14-story edifice that houses a grocery store and warehouse, is a block to the east. The nearest freeway is the 110, a few blocks west of the Metro stop.

References

Sources
Take Me Out to the Ball Park, Lowell Reidenbaugh, The Sporting News, 1983 & 1987, p. 138-142
Ballparks of North America, Michael Benson, McFarland, 1989, p. 209

External links
Chutes Park shown on Sanborn map, 1907
Washington Park shown on Sanborn map, 1922

Defunct baseball venues in the United States
Defunct minor league baseball venues
Demolished sports venues in California
Demolished buildings and structures in Los Angeles
Baseball venues in Los Angeles
Los Angeles Angels (PCL) stadiums
American football venues in Los Angeles
USC Trojans football venues
South Los Angeles
1911 establishments in California
Sports venues completed in 1911
1925 disestablishments in California
Sports venues demolished in 1925